Jalan Uniten–Dengkil or Jalan Ayer Hitam (Selangor state route B13) is a major highway in Selangor, Malaysia.

List of junctions

Highways in Malaysia
Roads in Selangor

References